Ricardo Álvarez Barragán (born 21 November 1981) is a Mexican professional boxer. His brothers are welterweights Ramón Álvarez, WBC Middleweight Champion Canelo Álvarez and former WBA World Light Middleweight Champion Rigoberto Álvarez.

Professional career
On June 28, 2008, Ricardo has seven brothers who made world history when all of them fought on the same card. The only downside being that three of them failed to win their pro debuts. The other four, more experienced brothers won.

Professional boxing record

See also
Notable boxing families

References

External links

1981 births
Living people
Mexican male boxers
Sportspeople from Guadalajara, Jalisco
Boxers from Jalisco
Lightweight boxers
Light-welterweight boxers